Michael Stephen Volcan (born March 3, 1962) is a Canadian former professional ice hockey defenceman who played 162 National Hockey League games for the Hartford Whalers and Calgary Flames from 1980 until 1984. He recorded eight goals and 33 assists in his career. Volcan was a third round draft pick, 50th overall by the Whalers in the 1980 NHL Entry Draft. He was the youngest player in the NHL in the 1980–81 season. Volcan retired following the 1990–91 season.

Volcan was born in Edmonton, Alberta. Volcan played two seasons of junior hockey for the St. Albert Saints of the Alberta Junior Hockey League, where he was a teammate of future NHLers Mark Messier and Troy Murray, before joining the Portland Winter Hawks for the 1979 Western Hockey League playoffs. He then played one season of college hockey with University of North Dakota.

On January 15, 1983, Volcan (as a member of the Hartford Whalers) and Garry Howatt (as a member of the New Jersey Devils) become the only active players to officiate an NHL game when a snowstorm prevented a referee, Ron Fournier, and a linesman, Ron Asselstine, from reaching the Hartford Civic Center for a game between the Whalers and Devils.

Career statistics

Regular season and playoffs

References

External links

1962 births
Living people
Baltimore Skipjacks players
Binghamton Whalers players
Calgary Flames players
Canadian expatriate ice hockey players in Finland
Canadian ice hockey defencemen
ECH Chur players
Colorado Flames players
Hartford Whalers draft picks
Hartford Whalers players
JYP Jyväskylä players
EV Landshut players
Moncton Golden Flames players
NCAA men's ice hockey national champions
North Dakota Fighting Hawks men's ice hockey players
Nova Scotia Oilers players
Phoenix Roadrunners (IHL) players
Portland Winterhawks players
SC Riessersee players
St. Albert Saints players
Ice hockey people from Edmonton